Li Hin Yu (born 4 January 1948) is a Hong Kong former swimmer. She competed in the women's 200 metre breaststroke at the 1964 Summer Olympics.

References

External links
 

1948 births
Living people
Hong Kong female breaststroke swimmers
Olympic swimmers of Hong Kong
Swimmers at the 1964 Summer Olympics
Place of birth missing (living people)